The Cat Burglar is a 1961 American neo-noir crime film written by actor and former criminal Leo Gordon and directed by William Witney. It starred Jack Hogan, June Kenney and John Baer.

Plot
A small-time crook steals a briefcase full of plans belonging to enemy agents.

Cast
 Jack Hogan as Jack Coley 
 June Kenney as Nan Baker 
 John Baer as Alan Sheridan 
 Gregg Palmer as Reed Taylor 
 Will J. White as Leo Joseph (as Will White)
 Gene Roth as Pete 
 Bruno VeSota as Muskie 
 Billie Bird as Mrs. Prattle
 Tommy Ivo as Willie Prattle

See also
 List of American films of 1961
 Cat burglar

References

External links

1961 films
1961 crime films
1960s spy films
American crime films
American spy films
1960s English-language films
Films directed by William Witney
American black-and-white films
United Artists films
1960s American films